The Boeing F/A-18E and F/A-18F Super Hornet are twin-engine, carrier-capable, multirole fighter aircraft variants derived from the McDonnell Douglas F/A-18 Hornet  series.  The F/A-18E single-seat and F/A-18F tandem-seat variants are larger and more advanced versions of the F/A-18C and D Hornet.

The Super Hornet has an internal 20mm M61A2 rotary cannon and can carry air-to-air missiles, air-to-surface and  a variety of other weapons. Additional fuel can be carried in up to five external fuel tanks and the aircraft can be configured as an airborne tanker by adding an external air-to-air refueling system.

Designed and initially produced by McDonnell Douglas, the Super Hornet first flew in 1995. Low-rate production began in early 1997 with full-rate production starting in September 1997, after the merger of McDonnell Douglas and Boeing the previous month. The Super Hornet entered fleet service with the United States Navy in 1999, replacing the Grumman F-14 Tomcat, which was retired in 2006; the Super Hornet has served alongside the original Hornet. The Royal Australian Air Force (RAAF), which has operated the F/A-18A as its main fighter since 1984, ordered the F/A-18F in 2007 to replace its aging General Dynamics F-111C fleet.  RAAF Super Hornets entered service in December 2010. In February 2023, Boeing announced plans to end production of the Super Hornet in 2025.

Development

Origins

The Super Hornet is a redesign of the McDonnell Douglas F/A-18 Hornet. The wing and tail configuration trace its origin to a Northrop prototype aircraft, the P-530, which began as a rework of the lightweight Northrop F-5E (with a larger wing, twin tail fins and a distinctive leading edge root extension, or LERX). Later flying as the Northrop YF-17 "Cobra", it competed in the United States Air Force's Lightweight Fighter (LWF) program to produce a smaller and simpler fighter to complement the larger McDonnell Douglas F-15 Eagle; the YF-17 lost the competition to the YF-16.

The Navy directed that the YF-17 be redesigned into the larger F/A-18 Hornet to meet a requirement for a multi-role fighter to complement the larger and more expensive Grumman F-14 Tomcat serving in fleet defense interceptor and air superiority roles. The Hornet proved to be effective but limited in combat radius.  The concept of an enlarged Hornet was first proposed in the 1980s, which was marketed by McDonnell Douglas as Hornet 2000. The Hornet 2000 concept was an advanced F/A-18 with a larger wing and a longer fuselage to carry more fuel and more powerful engines.

The end of the Cold War led to a period of military budget cuts and considerable restructuring.  At the same time, U.S. Naval Aviation faced a number of problems.  The McDonnell Douglas A-12 Avenger II was canceled in 1991 after the program ran into serious problems; it was intended to replace the obsolete Grumman A-6 Intruder. The Navy considered updating an existing design as a more attractive approach to a clean-sheet program. As an alternative to the A-12, McDonnell Douglas proposed the "Super Hornet" (initially "Hornet II" in the 1980s), an improvement of the successful previous F/A-18 models, which could serve as an alternate replacement for the A-6 Intruder. In addition, the Hornet itself lacked sufficient bringback capability, or the ability to recover unused weapons aboard aircraft carriers. The next-generation Hornet design proved more attractive than Grumman's Quick Strike upgrade to the F-14 Tomcat, which was regarded as an insufficient technological leap over existing F-14s.

At the time, the Grumman F-14 Tomcat was the Navy's primary air superiority fighter and fleet defense interceptor.  Then-Secretary of Defense Dick Cheney described the F-14 as 1960s technology, and drastically cut back F-14D procurement in 1989 before cancelling production altogether in 1991, in favor of the updated F/A-18E/F. The decision to replace the Tomcat with an all-Hornet Carrier Air Wing was controversial; Vietnam War ace and Congressman Duke Cunningham criticized the Super Hornet as an unproven design that compromised air superiority. In 1992, the Navy canceled the Navy Advanced Tactical Fighter (NATF), which would have been a navalized variant of the Air Force's Lockheed Martin F-22 Raptor. As a cheaper alternative to NATF, Grumman proposed substantial improvements to the F-14 beyond Quick Strike, but Congress rejected them as too costly and reaffirmed its commitment to the less expensive F/A-18E/F.

Testing and production

The Super Hornet was first ordered by the U.S. Navy in 1992. The Navy retained the F/A-18 designation to help sell the program to Congress as a low-risk "derivative", though the Super Hornet is largely a new aircraft. The Hornet and Super Hornet share many characteristics, including avionics, ejection seats, radar, armament, mission computer software, and maintenance/operating procedures.  The initial F/A-18E/F retained most of the avionics systems from the F/A-18C/D's configuration at the time. The design would be expanded in the Super Hornet with an empty weight slightly greater than the F-15C.

The Super Hornet first flew on 29 November 1995. Initial production on the F/A-18E/F began in 1995. Flight testing started in 1996 with the F/A-18E/F's first carrier landing in 1997. Low-rate production began in March 1997 with full production beginning in September 1997. Testing continued through 1999, finishing with sea trials and aerial refueling demonstrations. Testing involved 3,100 test flights covering 4,600 flight hours. The Super Hornet underwent U.S. Navy operational tests and evaluations in 1999, and was approved in February 2000.

With the retirement of the F-14 in 2006, all of the Navy's combat jets have been Hornet variants until the F-35C Lightning II entered service.  The F/A-18E single-seat and F/A-18F two-seat aircraft took the place of the F-14 Tomcat, A-6 Intruder, Lockheed S-3 Viking, and KA-6D aircraft. An electronic warfare variant, the EA-18G Growler, replaces the EA-6B Prowler. The Navy calls this reduction in aircraft types a "neck-down". During the Vietnam War era, the Super Hornet's roles were performed by a combination of the A-1/A-4/A-7 (light attack), A-6 (medium attack), F-8/F-4 (fighter), RA-5C (recon), KA-3/KA-6 (tanker), and EA-6 (electronic warfare). It was anticipated that $1 billion in fleetwide annual savings would result from replacing other types with the Super Hornet. The Navy considers the Super Hornet's acquisition a success, meeting cost, schedule, and weight (400 lb, 181 kg) below requirements.

Improvements and changes
The Block II Super Hornet incorporates an improved active electronically scanned array (AESA) radar, larger displays, the joint helmet mounted cueing system, and several other avionics replacements. Avionics and weapons systems that were under development for the prospective production version of the Boeing X-32 were used on the Block II Super Hornet. New-build aircraft received the APG-79 AESA radar beginning in 2005. In January 2008, it was announced that 135 earlier production aircraft were to be retrofitted with AESA radars.

In 2008, Boeing discussed the development of a Super Hornet Block III with the U.S. and Australian military, featuring additional stealth capabilities and extended range. In 2010, Boeing offered prospective Super Hornet customers the "International Roadmap", which included conformal fuel tanks, enhanced engines, an enclosed weapons pod (EWP), a next-generation cockpit, a new missile warning system, and an internal infrared search and track (IRST) system. The EWP has four internal stations for munitions, a single aircraft can carry a total of three EWPs, housing up to 12 AMRAAMs and 2 Sidewinders. The next-generation cockpit features a 19 x 11-inch touch-sensitive display. In 2011, Boeing received a US Navy contract to develop a new mission computer.

In 2007, Boeing stated that a passive Infrared Search and Track (IRST) sensor would be an available future option. The sensor, mounted in a modified centerline fuel tank, detects long wave IR emissions to spot and track targets such as aircraft; combat using the IRST and AIM-9X Sidewinder missiles is immune to radar jamming. In May 2009, Lockheed Martin announced its selection by Boeing for the IRST's technology development phase, and a contract followed in November 2011. , a basic IRST would be fielded in 2016 and a longer-range version in 2019; sequestration cuts in 2013 could cause two years of delays. An F/A-18F performed a flight equipped with the IRST system in February 2014, and Milestone C approval authorizing low-rate initial production (LRIP) was granted in December 2014.

Advanced Super Hornet and planned end of production
Boeing and Northrop Grumman self-funded a prototype of the Advanced Super Hornet. The prototype features a 50% reduction in frontal radar cross-section (RCS), conformal fuel tanks (CFT), and an enclosed weapons pod. Features could also be integrated onto the EA-18G Growler: using CFTs on the EA-18G fleet was speculated as useful for relieving underwing space and lowering the drag margin for the Next Generation Jammer. Flight tests of the Advanced Super Hornet began on 5 August 2013 and continued for three weeks, testing the performance of CFTs, the enclosed weapons pod (EWP), and signature enhancements. The U.S. Navy was reportedly pleased with the Advanced Super Hornet's flight test results, and hopes it will provide future procurement options.

In 2013, the U.S. Navy was considering the widespread adoption of CFTs, which would allow the Super Hornet to carry  of additional fuel. Budgetary pressures from the F-35C Lightning II and Pacific region operations were cited as reasons supporting the use of CFTs. Boeing stated that the CFTs do not add any cruise drag but acknowledged a negative impact imposed on transonic acceleration due to increased wave drag. In 2021, the U.S. Navy halted plans to fit CFTs as standard on all Block III Super Hornets due to cost, schedule, and performance issues.

In 2009, development commenced on several engine improvements, including greater resistance to foreign object damage, reduced fuel burn rate, and potentially increased thrust of up to 20%. In 2014, Boeing revealed a Super Hornet hybrid concept, equipped with the EA-18G Growler's electronic signal detection capabilities to allow for targets engagement using the receiver; the concept did not include the ALQ-99 jamming pod. Growth capabilities could include the addition of a long-range infrared search and track sensor and new air-to-air tracking modes.

In 2019, Boeing received a $4 billion contract to deliver 78 Block III Super Hornets for the Navy through fiscal 2021. The Navy plans to sign year to year contracts to convert all of its Block II aircraft to Block III variants through 2033. On 23 February 2023, Boeing announced plans to end Super Hornet  production in 2025 due to declining interest in the jet and competition from the F-35.

Design

Overview

The Super Hornet is largely a new aircraft at about 20% larger,  heavier empty weight, and  heavier maximum weight than the original Hornet. The Super Hornet carries 33% more internal fuel, increasing mission range by 41% and endurance by 50% over the "Legacy" Hornet. The empty weight of the Super Hornet is about  less than that of the F-14 Tomcat which it replaced, while approaching, but not matching, the F-14's payload and range. Being significantly heavier than the legacy Hornet, the catapult and arresting systems must be set differently. To aid safe flight operations and prevent confusion in radio calls, the Super Hornet is informally referred to as the "Rhino" to distinguish it from earlier Hornets. (The "Rhino" nickname was previously applied to the McDonnell Douglas F-4 Phantom II, which was retired in 1987.)

The Super Hornet, unlike the previous Hornet, can be equipped with an aerial refueling system (ARS) or "buddy store" for the refueling of other aircraft, filling the tactical airborne tanker role the Navy had lost with the retirement of the KA-6D and Lockheed S-3B Viking tankers. On typical missions a fifth of the air wing is dedicated to the tanker role, which consumes aircraft fatigue life expectancy faster than other missions. It most commonly uses JP-4 jet fuel.

Airframe changes

The forward fuselage is unchanged, but the remainder of the aircraft shares little with earlier F/A-18C/D models. The General Electric F414 engine, developed from the Hornet's F404, has 35% additional thrust over most of the flight envelope.

Other differences include intake ramps for the engines and two extra wing hard points for payload (for a total of 11), retaining previous hardpoints on the bottom centerline, wingtips, and two conformal fuselage positions. Among the most significant aerodynamic changes are the enlarged leading edge extensions (LEX) that provide improved vortex lifting characteristics in high angle of attack maneuvers, and reduce the static stability margin to enhance pitching characteristics. This modification results in pitch rates in excess of 40 degrees per second, and high resistance to departure from controlled flight.

Radar signature reduction measures

Survivability is a key feature of the Super Hornet. The U.S. Navy took a "balanced approach" to survivability in its design. It does not rely primarily on low-observability technology, but rather adopts improvements to its radar signature alongside other innovations; incorporating more advanced electronic warfare capabilities, reduced ballistic vulnerability, and greater employment of standoff weapons to collectively enhance crew and aircraft safety. While the F/A-18E/F is not a stealth fighter like the F-22, it does have a frontal radar cross-section (RCS) an order of magnitude smaller than prior generation fighters. Additional changes for reducing RCS can be installed on an as-needed basis.

The F/A-18E/F's RCS is reduced greatly from some aspects, mainly the front and rear. The design of the engine inlets reduces the aircraft's frontal radar cross-section. The alignment of the leading edges of the engine inlets is designed to scatter radiation to the sides. Fixed fanlike reflecting structures in the inlet tunnel divert radar energy away from the rotating fan blades. The Super Hornet also makes considerable use of panel joint serration and edge alignment to direct reflected waves away from the aircraft in uniformly narrow angles. Considerable attention is paid to the removal or filling of unnecessary surface join gaps and resonant cavities. Where the F/A-18A-D used grilles to cover various accessory exhaust and inlet ducts, the F/A-18E/F uses perforated panels that appear opaque to radar waves at the frequencies used.

Avionics

Initially, the Super Hornet's avionics and software had a 90% commonality with that of the F/A-18C/D fleet at the time. Differences include an up-front touchscreen control display; a large multipurpose color liquid-crystal display; and a fuel display. The Super Hornet has a quadruplex digital fly-by-wire system, as well as a digital flight-control system that detects and corrects for battle damage. Initial production models used the APG-73 radar, later replaced by the AN/APG-79 active electronically scanned array (AESA). The AN/ASQ-228 ATFLIR (Advanced Targeting Forward Looking InfraRed), is the main electro-optical sensor and laser designator pod for the Super Hornet. The communications equipment consist of an AN/ARC-210 VHF/UHF radio and a MIDS-JTRS low volume terminal for HAVE QUICK, SINCGARS and Link 16 connectivity.

The defensive countermeasures of Block I aircraft includes the AN/ALR-67(V)3 radar warning receiver, the AN/ALE-47 countermeasures dispenser, the AN/ALE-50 towed decoy and the AN/ALQ-165 Airborne Self-Protect Jammer (ASPJ). Block II aircraft replace the ALQ-165 with the AN/ALQ-214 Integrated Defensive Countermeasures (IDECM) system, consisting of internally mounted threat receivers and optional self-protection jammers. Interior and exterior lighting on the Block II was changed to allow the use of night vision devices. The older ALE-50 decoys are being replaced by ALE-55 towed decoys, which can transmit jamming signals based on data received from the IDECM. The improved AN/ALQ-214 jammer was added on Block II aircraft.

Block II aircraft were fitted with the AN/APG-79 AESA radar, capable of executing simultaneous air-to-air and air-to-ground attacks, and providing higher quality high-resolution ground mapping at long standoff ranges. The AESA radar can also detect smaller targets, such as inbound missiles and can track air targets beyond the range of the aircraft's air-to-air missiles. VFA-213, the first squadron to fly AESA-equipped Super Hornets, became "safe for flight" (independently fly and maintain the F/A-18F) on 27 October 2006. The first Super Hornet upgraded with the Joint Helmet Mounted Cueing System (JHMCS) was delivered to VFA-213 on 18 May 2007. The JHMCS provides multi-purpose situational awareness, which includes high-off-boresight missile cuing. The Shared Reconnaissance Pod (SHARP) is a high-resolution, digital tactical aerial reconnaissance system that features advanced day/night and all-weather capability. The Multifunctional Information Distribution System low volume communication terminal is being upgraded with the MIDS-JTRS system, which will allow a tenfold increase in bandwidth as well as compatibility with the Joint Tactical Radio System standards.

Development of Block III avionics upgrades has been underway as of April 2019.

Operational history

United States Navy

In 1999, the Super Hornet entered fleet service with the U.S. Navy. It achieved initial operating capability (IOC) in September 2001 with the U.S. Navy's Strike Fighter Squadron 115 (VFA-115) at Naval Air Station Lemoore, California. VFA-115 was also the first unit to take their F/A-18s into combat. On 6 November 2002, two F/A-18Es conducted a "Response Option" strike in support of Operation Southern Watch on two surface-to-air missile launchers at Al Kut, Iraq and an air defense command and control bunker at Tallil air base. One of the pilots dropped  JDAM bombs from the Super Hornet for the first time during combat.

In support of Operation Iraqi Freedom (Iraq War), VFA-14, VFA-41 and VFA-115 flew close air support, strike, escort, SEAD and aerial refueling sorties. The VFA-14 aircraft flew mostly as aerial refuelers and the VFA-41 fighters as Forward Air Controller (Airborne) or FAC(A)s. On 6 April 2005, VFA-154 and VFA-147 (the latter squadron then still operating F/A-18Cs) dropped two  laser-guided bombs on an enemy insurgent location east of Baghdad. 
On 8 September 2006, VFA-211 F/A-18Fs expended GBU-12 and GBU-38 bombs against Taliban fighters and Taliban fortifications west and northwest of Kandahar. This was the first time the unit had participated in an active combat capacity using the Super Hornet.

Alongside "Legacy Hornet" squadrons, VFA-131 and VFA-83, they dropped 140 precision guided weapons and performed nearly 70 strafing runs. The Super Hornet can operate from the French nuclear carrier Charles de Gaulle (R91).

In 2007, Boeing proposed additional F/A-18E/Fs to the U.S. Navy in a multi-year contract. By October 2008, Boeing had delivered 367 Super Hornets to the U.S. Navy. On 6 April 2009, Defense Secretary Robert Gates announced that the Department of Defense (DOD) intended to acquire 31 F/A-18s in FY2010. Congress requested the DoD study a further multi-year contract so that a projected fighter shortfall could be averted; in 2006, the Navy was 60 fighters below its validated requirement. The FY2010 budget bill authorized a multiyear purchase agreement for additional Super Hornets. A multi-year contract was finalized on 28 September 2010, reported as saving $600 million over individual yearly contracts, for 66 Super Hornets and 58 Growlers to mitigate a four-year delay in the F-35 program.

On 7 August 2014, U.S. defense officials announced they had been authorized to launch bombing missions upon Islamic State (IS) forces in northern Iraq. The decision to take direct action was made to protect U.S. personnel in the city of Irbil and to ensure the safety of transport aircraft making airdrops to Yazidi civilians. Later that day, four more aircraft struck a seven-vehicle convoy and a mortar position.

On 18 June 2017, a U.S. Navy F/A-18E shot down a Syrian Air Force Su-22 fighter-bomber that allegedly had bombed a position held by U.S.-supported Syrian Democratic Forces (SDF) near Tabqa; the Syrian government claimed the Su-22 was bombing an IS position. This was the first aerial kill of a crewed aircraft by an American fighter since 1999, the first by the Navy since the 1991 Persian Gulf War, the first kill by a Super Hornet, and the third kill by an F/A-18. An E-3 Sentry issued several warnings to the Su-22 and, after it dropped bombs near SDF fighters, the F/A-18E, piloted by Lieutenant Commander Michael "MOB" Tremel, a pilot assigned to Strike Fighter Squadron 87 aboard the carrier George H.W. Bush, independently chose to shoot it down based on established rules of engagement. The F/A-18E first missed with an AIM-9X Sidewinder, then hit the Su-22 with an AIM-120 AMRAAM; the encounter lasted eight minutes.

In 2018, Boeing was awarded a contract to convert nine single-seat F/A-18E Super Hornets and two F/A-18F two-seaters for Blue Angels use; these are to be completed by 2021.

Royal Australian Air Force
On 3 May 2007, the Australian Government signed an A$2.9 billion contract to acquire 24 F/A-18Fs as an interim replacement for the Royal Australian Air Force's (RAAF) aging F-111s. It was reported that the order would also address any difficulties that might be caused by a need to quickly replace the RAAF's existing fleet of classic F/A-18A/B Hornets in the event of delays to the F-35 program. The total cost of the purchase, with training and support over 10 years, was expected to be A$6 billion (US$4.6 billion).

The order was controversial; Air Vice Marshal (retired) Peter Criss, said that he was "absolutely astounded" that $6 billion would be spent on an interim aircraft, and cited the US Senate Armed Services Committee, to the effect that the "excess power" of the Block I Super Hornet was inferior to that of the MiG-29 and Su-30, both of which were being operated by, or were on order for, air forces in South East Asia. Another former senior RAAF officer, Air Commodore (ret.) Ted Bushell stated that the F/A-18F could not perform the strategic deterrent/strike role of the F-111C and the latter could continue to operate until 2020 at least. On 31 December 2007, the new Australian Labor government announced a review of the RAAF's aircraft procurement plans citing suitability concerns, the lack of a proper review process, and beliefs that an interim fighter was not needed.

On 17 March 2008, the Government announced that it would proceed to acquire 24 F/A-18Fs. Defence Minister Joel Fitzgibbon called the Super Hornet an "excellent aircraft", and indicated that costs and logistical factors contributed to the decision: the F-111's retirement was "irreversible"; "only" the F/A-18F could meet the timeframe and that termination involved "significant financial penalties and create understandable tensions between the contract partners." The Block II aircraft offered include installed engines and six spares, APG-79 AESA radars, Link 16 connectivity, LAU-127 guided missile launchers, AN/ALE-55 fiber optic towed decoys and other equipment. On 27 February 2009, Fitzgibbon announced that 12 of the 24 F/A-18Fs would be wired on the production line for future modification as Boeing EA-18G Growlers at an additional cost of A$35 million. The final decision on the EA-18G conversion, at a cost of A$300 million, would be made in 2012.

The first RAAF F/A-18F made its first flight from Boeing's factory in St. Louis, Missouri, on 21 July 2009. RAAF crews began training in the U.S. in 2009. The first five F/A-18Fs arrived at their home base, RAAF Base Amberley in Queensland, on 26 March 2010; and were joined by six more aircraft on 7 July 2010. After four more aircraft arrived in December 2010, the first RAAF F/A-18F squadron was declared operational on 9 December 2010.

In 2008, U.S. export approval was sought for EA-18G Growlers. In December 2012, Australia sought cost information on acquiring a further 24 F/A-18Fs, which may be bought to avoid a capability gap due to F-35 delays. In February 2013, the U.S. Defense Security Cooperation Agency notified Congress of a possible Foreign Military Sale to Australia for up to 12 F/A-18E/Fs and 12 EA-18Gs with associated equipment, training and logistical support. In May 2013, Australia announced the order of 12 new EA-18Gs instead of converting any F/A-18Fs. In June 2014, Boeing received a contract for 12 EA-18Gs; the first was rolled out on 29 July 2015.

On 24 September 2014, eight RAAF F/A-18Fs, along with a KC-30A tanker, an early warning aircraft, and 400 personnel arrived in the United Arab Emirates to take part in operations against Islamic State (IS) militants. On 5 October 2014, the RAAF officially started combat missions over Iraq using a pair of F/A-18Fs armed with GPS guided bombs, they returned safely to base without attacking targets. On 8 October 2014, an RAAF F/A-18F conducted its first attack, dropping two bombs on an ISIL facility in northern Iraq. In 2017, EA-18Gs replaced No. 6 Squadron RAAF's F/A-18Fs, which were then transferred to No. 1 Squadron RAAF.

On 8 December 2020, F/A-18F A44-223 rolled into a ditch while attempting to take off at RAAF Base Amberley, the crew ejected. An eyewitness reportedly observed smoke from one of the engines. A day after the incident, the RAAF grounded the fleet of 24 Super Hornets and 11 Growlers while the incident was investigated. The cause was determined to be pilot error.

Kuwait Air Force
In May 2015, the Kuwait Air Force was reportedly planning to order 28 F/A-18E/Fs with options for an additional 12. However, in June 2015, it was reported that Kuwait was considering a split purchase between the Eurofighter Typhoon and the F/A-18E/F. On 11 September 2015, Kuwait signed an agreement for 28 Eurofighters. In November 2016, a proposed Kuwaiti sale of 32 F/A-18E and 8 F/A-18F fighters, armaments, and associated equipment was approved by the U.S. State Department.

In June 2018, the Kuwaiti Government ordered 22 F/A-18Es and 6 F/A-18Fs via a US$1.5 billion contract. All aircraft were scheduled to be delivered by January 2021, but were later rescheduled to be delivered in 2021 due to the COVID-19 pandemic.

Potential operators

Boeing has pitched the F/A-18E/F to numerous countries, particularly those that operate the legacy Hornet as it was supposed to be a "logical progression from the Hornet to the [Super Hornet], with its logistics, weaponry and training commonalities". So far only the US Navy, Australia, and Kuwait have ordered and received the Super Hornet.

Malaysia
Boeing offered Malaysia Super Hornets as part of a buy-back package for its existing Hornets in 2002. However, the procurement was halted in 2007 after the government decided to purchase the Sukhoi Su-30MKM instead; Chief Gen. Datuk Nik Ismail Nik Mohamaed of the Royal Malaysian Air Force (RMAF) indicated that the air force had not planned to end the Super Hornet buy, stating that such fighters were needed. Separately, the Super Hornet is a contender for the MRCA program, under which the RMAF seek to equip three squadrons with 36 to 40 new fighters with an estimated budget of RM6 billion to RM8 billion (US$1.84 billion to US$2.46 billion). Other competitors are the Eurofighter Typhoon, Dassault Rafale and Saab JAS 39 Gripen.

India

For India's MMRCA competition, Boeing offered a customized variant called F/A-18IN, which included Raytheon's APG-79 AESA radar. In August 2008, Boeing submitted an industrial participation proposal detailing partnerships with companies in India. The Indian Air Force (IAF) extensively evaluated the Super Hornet, including field trials in August 2009. However, in April 2011, the IAF eliminated the F/A-18IN from the competition which was eventually won by the Dassault Rafale.

In October 2016, India reportedly received three unsolicited bids, including one from Boeing for the Super Hornet, to replace its MiG-21 and MiG-27 aircraft. In February 2018, the Indian Naval Air Arm was reportedly interested in the Super Hornet as the main carrier-based strike fighter of the in-development Vishal-class aircraft carrier. In December 2020, Boeing announced the successful launched of the aircraft from a ski-jump, emphasizing its compatibility with the Indian Navy's STOBAR carriers. In May 2022, two Super Hornets were sent to Goa to showcase compatibility with Indian aircraft carriers.

The aircraft is now competing with six others in a fresh tender, referred as MMRCA 2.0, for the procurement of 114 multi-role combat aircraft for the IAF.

Failed bids

Belgium

On 12 March 2014, Belgian newspaper De Morgen reported that Boeing is in talks with the Belgian Ministry of Defence about the Super Hornet as a candidate to replace Belgium's aging F-16 fleet. In April 2017, Boeing announced it would not compete in the competition, citing it "does not see an opportunity to compete on a truly level playing field". On 25 October 2018, Belgium officially selected the offer for 34 F-35As to replace its fleet of around 54 F-16s.

Brazil

Boeing proposed the Super Hornet to the Brazilian government in response to an initial requirement for 36 aircraft, with a potential total purchase of 120 examples. In October 2018, the Super Hornet was reportedly selected as one of three finalists in Brazil's fighter competition. However, news of National Security Agency spying on Brazilian leaders caused animosity between Brazil and the US. Brazil eventually dropped the Super Hornet from its final list and selected the Saab JAS 39 Gripen in December 2013.

Canada

The Super Hornet was a contender to replace the CF-18 Hornet, a version of the F/A-18A and B models, operated by the Royal Canadian Air Force. Like the older Hornet, the Super Hornet's design is well-suited to Northern Canada's rugged forward operational airfields, while its extended range removes its predecessor's main deficiency while commonalities enable a straightforward transition. In 2010, Canada decided on sole source selection of the F-35A. Boeing claimed that Canada had ignored the Super Hornet's radar cross-section characteristics during evaluation. By April 2012, Canada was reportedly reviewing its F-35 procurement. In September 2013, Boeing provided Canada with data on its Advanced Super Hornet, suggesting that 65 aircraft would cost $1.7 billion less than an F-35 fleet. The US Navy buys Super Hornets for $52 million per aircraft, while the advanced model costs $6–$10 million more per aircraft, dependent on options selected.

The Liberal government elected in 2015 indicated that it would launch a competition to replace the CF-18 fleet. During the election, Liberal Leader Justin Trudeau stated that his government would not buy the F-35. On 22 November 2016, the government announced its intention to acquire 18 Super Hornets on an interim basis. In September 2017, the U.S State Department granted Canada permission to buy 10 F/A-18Es and 8 F/A-18Fs (or EA-18Gs) along with supporting equipment, spares, and armaments; the agreed cost totaled CA$1.5 billion, or about CA$83.3 million per aircraft, adding the supporting equipment, training, spares, and weapons increased the acquisition cost to CA$6.3 billion. However, Canadian Prime Minister Justin Trudeau warned that the pending Super Hornet sale, along with a possible sale of another 70, was adversely affected by Boeing's actions against Bombardier Aerospace, such as a complaint to the US government over the sale of CSeries airliners to Delta Air Lines at unduly low prices; in September 2017, the U.S. Department of Commerce proposed a 219% tariff on CSeries imported into the US. In January 2018, the USITC commissioners unanimously ruled against Boeing that the U.S. industry is not threatened and no duties will be imposed.

In late 2017, the Canadian Government agreed with Australia to purchase 18 used F/A-18 Hornets as an interim measure. Boeing confirmed its bid for the Advanced Fighter Program, likely offering a mix of 88 F/A-18E/F Advanced Super Hornets (Block III) and Boeing EA-18G Growlers. On 25 November 2021, Reuters reported that Boeing is out of the competition since its fighter proposal does not meet requirements with the F-35 and Saab JAS 39 Gripen remaining in competition.

Denmark

In 2008, the Royal Danish Air Force was offered the F/A-18E/F Super Hornet as one of three fighters in a Danish competition to replace 48 F-16AM/BMs. The other contenders were the F-35A Joint Strike Fighter and the Eurofighter Typhoon. Denmark is a level-3 partner in the JSF program. The final selection was originally planned for mid-2015 where 24 to 30 fighters were expected. In April 2014, the Danish Ministry of Defence handed over a Request for Binding Information (RBI) that specifically listed the F/A-18F two-seat variant. In December 2015, the decision was postponed to 2016, with the final order's details pending negotiations. In May 2016, the Danish government recommended to parliament that 27 F-35As should be procured instead of 38 Super Hornets.

In September 2016, Boeing indicated that they would take legal action against the Danish F-35A buy, indicating that flawed data was used. In March 2018, Boeing lost the case with the court stating "The court has found that the authorities' decisions on refusal of access to the documents are legal and valid."

Finland

In June 2015, a working group set up by the Finnish MoD proposed starting the HX Fighter Program to replace the Finnish Air Force's current fleet of F/A-18C/D Hornets, which will reach the end of their service life by the end of the 2020s. The group recognised five potential types: Boeing F/A-18E/F Advanced Super Hornet, Dassault Rafale, Eurofighter Typhoon, Lockheed Martin F-35 Lightning II and Saab JAS 39 Gripen. In May 2016, the DOD announced that Boeing (with the Super Hornet) and Lockheed Martin (with the F-35) would respond to the information request. This request was sent in early 2016 with five responses received in November 2016. A call for tender will be sent in spring 2018 and the buying decision is scheduled to take place in 2021.

In February 2020, three Super Hornets (a single-seat F/A-18E, a twin-seat F/A-18F and an EA-18G) arrived at the Tampere-Pirkkala Airbase in Finland for final flight evaluations. The evaluations concluded on 28 February 2020. The Finnish newspaper Iltalehti reported that several foreign and security policy sources had confirmed the Finnish Defense Forces recommendation of the F-35, citing its capability and expected long lifespan as key reasons. Finland ordered the F-35 in February 2022.

Germany

Germany requires a replacement for its aging Panavia Tornado fleet, including both Tornado IDS (interdictor/strike) and ECR (Electronic Combat/Reconnaissance) variants.  Germany considered ordering the Lockheed Martin F-35, Eurofighter Typhoon, and the Boeing F/A-18E/F Super Hornet and EA-18G Growler. In April 2020, Germany's defense secretary announced a replacement plan for a split purchase of 30 Super Hornets, 15 EA-18Gs and 55 Typhoons. However, the Defense Ministry states this is not finalized and it is being debated. As of March 2020, the Super Hornet is not certified for the B61 nuclear bombs, but Dan Gillian, Super Hornet program head, previously stated that "We certainly think that we, working with the U.S. government, can meet the German requirements..."

With increased tensions in Europe, due to the Russian invasion of Ukraine beginning 24 February 2022, Germany scrambled to accelerate defense spending priorities. Newly elected Chancellor Olaf Scholz pledged a €100 billion military upgrade, which included selecting the F-35 instead of the Super Hornet for the nuclear role and Eurofighter ECR/SEAD instead of the Growler.

Poland

During the 2010s, Poland sought to purchase 64 multirole combat aircraft from 2021 to replace the Polish Air Force's fleet of Sukhoi Su-22M4 ground attack aircraft and Mikoyan MiG-29 fighters. In November 2017, the Armament Inspectorate launched the acquisition process. On 22 December 2017, five entities expressed interest in participating in the market analysis phase of the procurement, referred to as "Harpia" (harpy eagle); they included Saab (Gripen NG), Lockheed Martin (F-35), Boeing (F/A-18), Leonardo (Eurofighter Typhoon) and Fights-On Logistics (second-hand F-16). On 28 May 2019, the Polish Defense Ministry formally requested to buy 32 F-35As.

Switzerland

Boeing first offered the Super Hornet to the Swiss Air Force as a replacement for Swiss F-5E Tigers before withdrawing from the competition on 30 April 2008. The Swiss Air Force was at one point intending to buy the rival Saab Gripen, but this was blocked by Swiss voters in 2014. In March 2018, Swiss officials named contenders in its Air 2030 program: The Saab Gripen, Dassault Rafale, Eurofighter Typhoon, Boeing F/A-18E/F Super Hornet and Lockheed Martin F-35. The program has a budget of  but includes not only combat aircraft but also ground-based air defense systems. In October 2018, it was reported by Jane's that the Swiss Air Force may be limited to purchasing a single-engine fighter due to cost. The F/A-18E/F performed demonstrations for Swiss personnel at Payerne Air Base in April 2019, which was contrasted to flights performed by other bidders.

On 30 June 2021, the Swiss Federal Council proposed buying 36 F-35As to Parliament at a cost of up to 6 billion Swiss francs (US$6.5 billion), citing the aircraft's cost and combat effectiveness. The anti-military group GSoA intended to contest the purchase in another national referendum supported by the Green Party of Switzerland and the Social Democratic Party of Switzerland (which previously acted to block the Gripen). In August 2022, they registered the initiative, with 120,000 people having signed in less than a year (with 100,000 required). On 26 November 2021, it was announced that Armasuisse had agreed terms with the US government for 36 F-35As for CHF 6.035 billion. The order was then subject to parliamentary approval and the popular initiative not proceeding or failing. A parliamentary inquiry found the purchase worrisome but legal. The government did not wait for the popular initiative to proceed, which was legally permitted. On 15 September 2022, the Swiss National council gave the Federal council permission to sign the purchase deal. The deal to buy 36 F-35A was signed on 19 September 2022, with deliveries to commence in 2027 and conclude by 2030.

Spain
By 2018, Spain sought 68-72 fighters to replace its F/A-18A/B Hornets; tender participants included the Eurofighter Typhoon, Dassault Rafale, Boeing F/A-18 E/F Advanced Super Hornet, and Lockheed F-35 Lightning II. On 22 June 2022, Spain ordered 20 Tranche 4 Typhoons to replace the 20 ex-USN F/A-18 based at the Canary Islands.

United States Marine Corps
The United States Marine Corps (USMC) avoided the Super Hornet program over fears that any buys will be at the cost of the F-35B STOVL fighters that they intend to operate from amphibious ships. Resistance is so high that they would rather fly former Navy F/A-18Cs. In 2011, the USMC agreed to eventually equip five Marine fighter-attack squadrons (VMFA) with the F-35C carrier variant to continue to augment Navy carrier air wings as they do with the F/A-18C.

Others

On 10 March 2009, Boeing offered the Super Hornet for Greece's Next-Generation Fighter Program.

On 1 August 2010, The Sunday Times reported that the British government was considering canceling orders for the F-35B and buying the Super Hornet instead for its s, claiming a saving of around £10 billion as a result. An industry source claimed that the Super Hornet could be ski jump launched without catapults. In the end, the UK opted for a STOVL aircraft carrier equipped with F-35Bs.

The United Arab Emirates was reported to have asked for information on the Super Hornet in 2010.

In early 2011, Bulgaria was considering the F/A-18 as a replacement for its MiG-21 fleet. After initially selecting the Saab Gripen, the newly elected governing coalition restarted the program and indicated that the Super Hornet is again under consideration. The decision is expected by July 2018. In December 2018, the Bulgarian Ministry of Defence selected the offer for 8 F-16V from the United States for an estimated 1.8 billion lev ($1.05 billion) as the preferred option, and recommended the government to start talks with the US.

In 2012, Norway received an offer for at least one squadron of F/A-18s, noting its suitability to Northern Norwegian conditions.

In 2014, Boeing worked with Korean Airlines to offer the Advanced Super Hornet to the Republic of Korea Air Force as an alternative to their KF-X fighter program. Although a fighter based on the Super Hornet would save money, downgrading the program would not give South Korean industry as much knowledge as it would from developing a new fighter.

Variants
F/A-18E Super Hornet: single seat variant.
F/A-18F Super Hornet: two-seat variant.
NEA-18G: Two F/A-18Fs modified as prototypes of the EA-18G Growler.
EA-18G Growler: Electronic warfare variant of the F/A-18F to replace the U.S. Navy's Northrop Grumman EA-6B Prowler.
Advanced Super Hornet: Variant of the F/A-18E/F Super Hornet with Conformal Fuel Tanks (CFT) and has a further reduced radar cross section (RCS), with the option of a stealthy enclosed weapons pod and built-in IRST21 sensor system.

Operators

 Australia
Royal Australian Air Force
No. 1 Squadron (F/A-18F)
No. 6 Squadron (EA-18G)
No. 82 Wing Training Flight (F/A-18F)

 Kuwait
 Kuwait Air Force – 22 single-seat F/A-18Es and 6 twin-seat F/A-18Fs on order

 United States
United States Navy
 Pacific Fleet squadrons
VFA-2 "Bounty Hunters" (F/A-18F)
VFA-14 "Tophatters" (F/A-18E)
VFA-22 "Fighting Redcocks" (F/A-18F)
VFA-25 "Fist of the Fleet" (F/A-18E)
VFA-27 "Royal Maces" (F/A-18E)
VFA-41 "Black Aces" (F/A-18F)
VFA-86 "Sidewinders" (F/A-18E)
VFA-94 "Mighty Shrikes" (F/A-18F)
VFA-102 "Diamondbacks" (F/A-18F)
VFA-113 "Stingers" (F/A-18E)
VFA-115 "Eagles" (F/A-18E)
VFA-122 "Flying Eagles" (Fleet Replacement Squadron, operates F/A-18E/F)
VFA-136 "Knighthawks" (F/A-18E)
VFA-137 "Kestrels" (F/A-18E)
VFA-146 "Blue Diamonds" (F/A-18E)
VFA-151 "Vigilantes" (F/A-18E)
VFA-154 "Black Knights" (F/A-18F)
VFA-192 "Golden Dragons" (F/A-18E)
VFA-195 "Dambusters" (F/A-18E)
 Atlantic Fleet squadrons
VFA-11 "Red Rippers" (F/A-18F)
VFA-31 "Tomcatters" (F/A-18E)
VFA-32 "Swordsmen" (F/A-18F)
VFA-34 "Blue Blasters" (F/A-18E)
VFA-37 "Ragin Bulls" (F/A-18E)
VFA-81 "Sunliners" (F/A-18E)
VFA-83 "Rampagers" (F/A-18E)
VFA-87 "Golden Warriors" (F/A-18E)
VFA-103 "Jolly Rogers" (F/A-18F)
VFA-105 "Gunslingers" (F/A-18E)
VFA-106 "Gladiators" (Fleet Replacement Squadron, operates F/A-18A/B/C/D/E/F)
VFA-131 "Wildcats" (F/A-18E)
VFA-143 "Pukin' Dogs" (F/A-18E)
VFA-211 "Fighting Checkmates" (F/A-18E)
VFA-213 "Black Lions" (F/A-18F)
Test and Evaluation squadrons
VX-9 "Vampires" (Air Test and Evaluation Squadron, operates F/A-18E/F and other aircraft)
VX-23 "Salty Dogs" (Air Test and Evaluation Squadron, operates F/A-18E/F and other aircraft)
VX-31 "Dust Devils" (Air Test and Evaluation Squadron, operates F/A-18E/F and other aircraft)
Warfighting Development Centers
NAWDC (Naval Aviation Warfighting Development Center, operates F/A-18E/F and other aircraft)
Flight Demonstration squadrons
U.S. Navy Flight Demonstration Squadron / Blue Angels (F/A-18E/F)

Each U.S. Navy deployable "Fleet" VFA squadron has a standard unit establishment of 12 aircraft.

Notable accidents
 On 6 April 2011, a U.S. Navy F/A-18F from VFA-122 Tactical Demonstration team crashed, killing both crew members. The crash occurred when the crew attempted to perform a loaded roll with too much speed and insufficient angle-of-attack. The loaded roll has since been removed from the Navy's F/A-18F flight demonstration routine.
 On 31 July 2019, a U.S. Navy F/A-18E from VFA-151 crashed into the side of "Star Wars Canyon" in California, killing the pilot and injuring seven French civilian sightseers at the Father Crowley Vista Point 40 feet above the impact point. The crash was attributed to flying "too fast and too low with respect to the surrounding terrain". Military training within the canyon has since been suspended, with standing instructions to stay above the rim of the canyon.
 On 8 July 2022, a U.S. Navy F/A-18 Super Hornet assigned to Carrier Air Wing One aboard  (CVN-75) blew overboard due to unexpected heavy weather in the Mediterranean Sea.

Specifications (F/A-18E/F)

See also

References

Notes

Citations

Bibliography

 Donald, David. "Boeing F/A-18E/F Super Hornet", Warplanes of the Fleet. London: AIRtime Publishing Inc, 2004. .
 Elward, Brad. Boeing F/A-18 Hornet (WarbirdTech, Vol. 31). North Branch, Minnesota: Specialty Press, 2001. .
 Elward, Brad. The Boeing F/A-18E/F Super Hornet & EA-18G Growler: A Developmental and Operational History. Atglen, Pennsylvania: Schiffer Publishing, Ltd. 2013. .
 Holmes, Tony. US Navy Hornet Units of Operation Iraqi Freedom. London: Osprey Publishing, 2004. .
 Jenkins, Dennis R. F/A-18 Hornet: A Navy Success Story. New York: McGraw-Hill, 2000. .
 Winchester, Jim. The Encyclopedia of Modern Aircraft. San Diego: Thunder Bay Press, 2006. .

External links

F/A-18 U.S. Navy fact file , and F/A-18 Navy history page
Boeing F/A-18 Super Hornet page and Super Hornet Aero India briefing on Boeing.com

F A-18E F Super Hornet
Air refueling
Aircraft first flown in 1995
Articles containing video clips
Carrier-based aircraft
Mid-wing aircraft
Twinjets
1990s United States attack aircraft
1990s United States fighter aircraft
Attack aircraft
Fighter aircraft
Naval aviation
Fourth-generation jet fighter
4.5-generation jet fighters